Vikram Bawa (born 16 March 1970) is an Indian fashion, advertising and landscape photographer based in Mumbai. He was the first Indian photographer to promote and showcase 3D photography in the late 1990s.

Life and work
Bawa was born in Delhi. He moved with his parents to Mumbai at an early age. He went to Green Lawns High School, Mumbai. After which he graduated in maths from Elphinstone College, Mumbai. He started work as the managing director of a chemical firm at age 18. In 1996, he started photography professionally.

Bawa started photography as a hobby when he was 16 years old. His mother and father were avid hobbyists, which influenced Bawa.

Bawa started shooting on a Yashica automatic camera and his father’s Yashica TLR. The first camera which he bought was a Yashica FX 3 Super 2000 SLR. It was on this camera that he learnt the photography skills of which he makes use today.

He has also directed music videos and a film called ‘Yahaan Gandhi Bikta Nahin’, a short film on Gandhi in present that has been part of a traveling exhibition to art galleries across India. He has pioneered Fashion Films in India and has made fashion films for various clients including Jewels by Queenie, Nikhil Thampi, Gitanjali, Joy Shoes, Harshita Deshpande and Delna Poonawala.

Bawa's first photography assignment was with Rani Jeyraj (Femina Miss India 1996). Since then he has shot for magazines including Femina, Verve, Hello!, L'Officiel, Elle, Hi Blitz, Marie Claire, TheTechy, and Stuff.

Brands that Bawa has worked for include Coca-Cola, Dove, Godrej, L'oreal, Reebok, Skoda India, Sony Electronics, Taj Hotels, Catwalk, Kingfisher airlines, Sahara Ambey Valley, The Leela Palace, Goa, and FSP London.

He has photographed Bollywood celebrities Amitabh Bachchan, Akshay Kumar, Shilpa Shetty, Aishwarya Rai Bachchan, Nawazuddin Siddiqui, Abhishek Bachchan, Shah Rukh Khan, Karishma Kapoor, Priyanka Chopra, Hrithik Roshan, and Lara Dutta.

He unveiled his own Fashion Calendar on the theme of Draupadi for 2014 in Mumbai with stars like Kabir Bedi, Neil Nitin Mukesh, Evelyn Sharma, Shamita Shetty, Nimrat Kaur and many more in attendance.

Exhibitions

Solo exhibition
The Other Side, Gallery Art and Soul, Mumbai, India, November 2012.

Group exhibition
Articulate 2011: An Exhibition of Contemporary Photography, Saffronart, London, October 2011

Collections
Bawa's work is held in the following permanent collections:
Priyasi Art Gallery
Gallery Art and Soul, Mumbai, India
Jindal Art Foundation
Alfaz Miller Collection

Recognition and awards 
Nicknamed as "Master of Gimmicks" in the world of fashion photography, Vikram has won many awards from Masters Cup, Prix de la Photographie Paris, The International Color Awards, Spider Awards, Asian Photography Most Influential Photographer Award, PIEA Award and many more.
 Vikram received four international awards for his Leela Palace Goa hotel campaign - a first for any Indian hotel campaign.
 Vikram’s fashion film ‘The Long Show’ was nominated for the International Fashion Film Awards (IFFA) 2014 for Best Art Direction and Best Music Nomination.
 He was judged as the "2nd best photographer at the PMA International Awards, USA" for his 3D photography. The images were part of a 30 country travelling exhibition.

References

External links

1970 births
Living people
Indian fashion photographers
Artists from Mumbai
Elphinstone College alumni